Vermaak is an Afrikaans surname. Notable people with the surname include:

 Coen Vermaak, leader of the Boerestaat Party
Ian Vermaak (born 1933), South African tennis player
Jano Vermaak (born 1985), South African rugby union player
Jacobus 'Cobie"  Vermaak (born 19xx) South African born brother of Notoriously renowned Lise & Philip (the 3rd) Vermaak 
Yvonne Vermaak, South African-born American tennis player

Afrikaans-language surnames
Surnames of Dutch origin